"The Space Between" is a 2001 song by the Dave Matthews Band.

The Space Between may also refer to:

Films
 The Space Between (2010 film), a 2010 feature film written and directed by Travis Fine
 The Space Between (2011 film), 2011 Scottish film
 The Space Between (2016 film), 2016 Australian film
 The Space Between (2017 film), 2017 Canadian film
 The Space Between (2021 film), 2021 American film

Music
 The Space Between (Majid Jordan album), 2017
 The Space Between (Illy album), 2021
 "The Space Between", a 1982 song by Roxy Music on the album Avalon (Roxy Music album)

Books
  The Space Between (2020 book), a self-help book by Shameless journalists Michelle Andrews and Zara McDonald
 The Space Between, a 2013 novella in the Outlander series by Diana Gabaldon

See also
 Space Between (disambiguation)
 The Space Between Us (disambiguation)